Polica, locally known as Police, is a mountain, in southern Poland near Zawoja, in the Żywiec Beskids mountain range.

LOT Polish Airlines Flight 165 crashed on the northern slope of Police on 2 April 1969.  The accident spot is marked by a cross, erected in the 1990s.

Until 1918, Polica was on the border between Galicia and Hungary, and between 1918 and 1920 on the Polish-Czechoslovak border.

References

Mountains of Poland
Landforms of Lesser Poland Voivodeship